The North American Gay Amateur Athletic Alliance  (NAGAAA) is a non-profit, international association of gay and lesbian softball leagues.

NAGAAA was founded in 1977 and the first elected Commissioner was Warren Shepell, from Toronto, Ontario, Canada, and currently has 52 member leagues in the United States and Canada. The current Commissioner is John Deffee.

NAGAAA recognizes seven divisions of play, from the competitive A rank through B, C, D and E teams, plus two Masters Divisions for players age 50 and above.  NAGAAA also maintains a player rating system used to evaluate player skill levels to ensure safety and competitive play.  While each member city operates independently, NAGAAA membership allows for a consistent framework for operating interleague play during numerous tournaments hosted by member cities and at the two annual NAGAAA hosted tournaments, the Gay Softball World Series (GSWS) for all divisions and the NAGAAA Cup Invitational tournament for A and B division teams. The 2019 GSWS held in Kansas City includes "208 teams and is expected to attract more than 5,000 people." The NAGAAA has grown to more than 3,000 teams and 25,000 participants. The GSWS is the largest annual, LGBTQ, "single-sport, week-long athletic competition in the world."

Prior to 2007, there was also a division for all female teams but the Amateur Sports Alliance of North America was formed from NAGAAA in 2007.

Current member leagues
 Atlanta: Hotlanta Softball
 Austin: Softball Austin 
 Birmingham: New South Softball League 
 Boston: Beantown Softball League 
 Charlotte: Carolina Piedmont Softball League
 Chicago: Chicago Metropolitan Sports Association
 Columbus: Columbus Lesbian Gay Softball Association 
 Dallas: Pegasus Slowpitch Softball Association 
 Denver: Denver Area Softball League
 Des Moines: Pride Sports League of Central Iowa
 Fort Lauderdale: South Florida Amateur Athletic Association
 Hamilton: Steel City Inclusive Softball
 Houston: Montrose Softball League
 Huntsville: NexUs Softball League
 Indianapolis: Circle City Pride Softball League
 Iowa City: Lambda Softball Association
 Kansas City: Heart of America Softball League
 Knoxville: K-Town Softball League
 Las Vegas: Las Vegas Gay Softball League
 Long Beach: Long Beach/Orange County Surf & Sun Softball Association
 Los Angeles: The Greater Los Angeles Softball Association (GLASA)
 Louisville: Derby City Pride League
 Madison: Badgerland Softball League
 Memphis: Bluff City Sports Association 
 Mid-Atlantic (Norfolk/Richmond): Mid-Atlantic Softball Association
 Milwaukee: Saturday Softball Beer League 
 Nashville: Metro Nashville Softball Association
 New Orleans: NOLA Softball League
 New York City: Big Apple Softball League 
 Oklahoma City: Sooner State Softball Alliance of OKC 
 Orlando: Central Florida Softball League
 Palm Springs: Palm Springs Gay Softball League
 Philadelphia: City of Brotherly Love Softball League
 Phoenix: Cactus Cities Softball League
 Portland: Rose City Softball Association
 Providence, Rhode Island: Renaissance City Softball League 
 Raleigh: Oak City Softball League
 Sacramento: Sacramento Valley Gay and Lesbian Softball
 San Antonio:  San Antonio Gay Softball League
 San Diego: America's Finest City Softball League 
 San Francisco: San Francisco Gay Softball League
 San Jose: Silicon Valley Softball League 
 Seattle: Emerald City Softball Association
 Sioux Falls: Sioux Empire Pride Sports Association
 Southern New England (Connecticut): Southern New England Friendship League 
 St. Louis: St. Louis Gay and Lesbian Association of Summer Softball 
 Tampa: Suncoast Softball League 
 Toronto: Cabbagetown Group Softball League 
 Tulsa: Tulsa Metro Softball League
 Twin Cities (Minneapolis/St. Paul): Twin Cities Goodtime Softball League 
 Vancouver: West End SloPitch Association
 Washington, D.C.:  Chesapeake and Potomac Softball League

Gay Softball World Series
Each year teams representing these leagues participate in the NAGAAA Gay Softball World Series (GSWS), hosted each year in a different member city.

Each member city is allowed to send an unlimited number of teams in the A division and up to three team in each of the B, C, D and E divisions based on the size of the local league, with larger cities allowed more teams.  Members cities are encouraged to send at least one team to the GSWS each year.  

Future sites for the Gay Softball World Series 
2023 - Twin Cities, Minnesota
2024 - Las Vegas, Nevada

Gay Softball World Series Champions

Co-Champions have been declared in 2010 and 2018 for some divisions due to inclement weather.

See also

LGBT community

References

External links
 NAGAAA
 Annual Gay Softball World Series

International LGBT sports organizations
Softball organizations
Softball in North America